South Korean girl group Girls' Generation has received various awards and nominations since their debut in 2007. They rose to fame in 2009 with their hit single, "Gee", which later became known as "Song of the Decade". Within two days, the song became number one on all music charts and broke the record for longest-running number one on Music Bank with nine consecutive wins. The group then released several hit singles such as "Tell Me Your Wish (Genie)" in 2009, "Oh!" in 2010, "The Boys" in 2011, "I Got a Boy" in 2013 and "Lion Heart" in 2015. The group became the first girl group to win both a Disk Daesang (2010) and a Digital Daesang (2009) at the Golden Disc Awards, and also the first girl group to win a Daesang award three times in a row.


Awards and nominations

Other accolades

State honors

Listicles

See also

 Girls' Generation discography
 Girls' Generation videography
 List of songs by Girls' Generation
 List of Girls' Generation concert tours

Notes

References

Awards
Girls' Generation